Alliance for New Nigeria (ANN) is a political party in Nigeria.
It was founded in March, 2017 by some politically concerned Nigerians. The current National Chairman of the party is Mr. Emmanuel Dania. The party got officially registered and announced by the Independent National Electoral Commission (INEC) as a full fledged political party on January 10, 2018.

References

Political parties in Nigeria
Political parties established in 2017
2017 establishments in Nigeria